Juan de Urrede (c.1430-after 1482, Salamanca, Spain) or Juan de Urreda was a Flemish singer and composer active in Spain in the service of the Duke of Alba and King Ferdinand and Queen Isabella. He was born Johannes de Wreede in Bruges.

He composed several settings of the Pange Lingua Gloriosi Corporis Mysterium, mostly based on the original Mozarabic melody composed by St. Thomas Aquinas. One of his compositions for four voices was widely performed in the sixteenth century, and became the basis for a number of keyboard works and masses by Spanish composers. Although he wrote sacred songs, he was better known for courtly songs.

Works
Urrede's music has been recorded and issued on media including:

Cancionero de Segovia: Pange Lingua 
El Cancionero de la Catedral de Segovia, The Segovia Cathedral Songbook, Ensemble Daedalus, Roberto Festa

Nunca fue pena mayor (Never was there greater sorrow). Chanson. c.1470 for instruments
from the Cancionero de la Colombina 1460-1490
from Harmonice Musices Odhecaton Venice 1501
Ens Les Flamboyants. Rosa Dominguez voice, Viva Biancaluna Biffi fiddle, Jane Achtmann fiddle/viola d'arco, Irene Klein viola da gamba, Norihisa Sugawara lute/fiddle, Giovanna Pessi harp, Michael Form, Luis Beduschi, Gerit Kropfl recorders, Rogerio Goncalves percussion
Zefiro Torna. Eufoda 1343
Montserrat Figueras, Hesperion XX / Jordi Savall. Astree 9954
Montserrat Figueras, Hesperion XX / Luiz Alves de Silva. Fontalis 8763
Ferre, Binchois Ensemble / D.Vellard. EMI Virgin Classics 567-545359
Hilliard Ensemble. EMI Virgin Classics 653-561394
Waverly Consort / Jaffee. EMI Virgin Classics 621-561815
Newberry Consort. Harmonia Mundi France 7907083
Larry Hill, Gregory Tambornino. Meridian 84406
Nancy Knowles, Frank Wallace. Centaur 2109	

Donde estas que non te veo for voice and instruments
from the Cancionero de la Colombina 1460-1490
Montserrat Figueras s, Hesperion XX / Jordi Savall. Astree 9954	

Muy triste sera mi vida from the Cancionero de la Colombina 1460-1490
Hesperion XX / Jordi Savall. Astree 9954

References

Year of birth uncertain
Year of death unknown

Dutch male classical composers
Dutch classical composers
Renaissance composers
Spanish classical composers
Spanish male classical composers
15th-century composers